Hdif or HDIF may refer to:

How Does It Feel to Be Loved?, a London night club
How does it feel to be loved, which has numerous meanings
Human Development Innovation Fund, a DFID challenge fund